The Gypaetinae is one of two subfamilies of Old World vultures the other being the Aegypiinae. Some taxonomic authorities place the Gypaetinae within the Perninae hawks. They are presently found throughout much of Africa, Asia, and southern Europe, hence being considered "Old World" vultures, but as recently as the Late Pleistocene, they were also present in North America.

A 2005 study found Eutriorchis astur to be closely related.

Species

Extant genera

Fossil genera 
Genera known only from fossils include:

References

Other sources 

 
Accipitridae
Vultures
Birds of prey